Redwood Symphony is an American orchestra based in Redwood City, California, in the San Francisco Bay Area. It is the Orchestra in Residence at Cañada College. Redwood Symphony is an all-volunteer orchestra dedicated to the creation of an alternative model of the symphony orchestra in the 21st century. To accomplish this goal, the orchestra concentrates on ambitious, contemporary repertoire, experiments with the concert format and adopts a more informal mode of dress than most other groups. Notable accomplishments are performances of all of the symphonies of Gustav Mahler and many world and local premieres.

Mission and History

Redwood Symphony was founded by Eric Kujawsky in 1985, as an outgrowth of the Stanford Summer Orchestra, started by  Dr. Kujawsky at Stanford University where he was a doctoral student (D.M.A. in Conducting, 1985). The orchestra initially performed at Foothill College, but moved to Cañada College in August, 1987.

Redwood Symphony has maintained an unusual profile throughout its history.  From the onset, Dr. Kujawsky started with several unusual premises that have been key to the orchestra’s success.

The first was that, in an area like the San Francisco Peninsula, with its many highly educated professionals and musical ensembles, there would be many amateur musicians who had grown bored playing the standard repertoire and would enthusiastically embrace a group dedicated to playing works normally associated with professional orchestras.  The result is a volunteer group of uncommonly good quality, rarely supplemented by paid personnel other than featured guest soloists.  The quality is good enough to have allowed the orchestra to record six studio-recorded CDs.

The second premise is that an orchestra, even a community orchestra, should enthusiastically promote contemporary music to keep classical music relevant in an age dominated by pop music.  Redwood Symphony has a strong record not only of premieres but of also doing the first local performances of important works after they’ve been premiered by the San Francisco Symphony or Cabrillo Music Festival.  Besides Mahler symphonies, Redwood Symphony has performed most of the major orchestral works of Igor Stravinsky and Béla Bartók, as well as music by John Adams, Michael Daugherty, Aaron Copland and other 20th- and 21st-century composers.

The third premise is that Redwood Symphony would strive to differentiate itself from the competition not in only repertoire, but also in concert format and dress, to appeal more to audiences that are new to classical music.  Dress is “formal casual”; black with a “splash of color,” with jackets and ties generally eschewed.  Encores and extra small works are often slipped into the programming, the orchestra is used to demonstrate important points, and comedy bits—including an ongoing series of recorded reminders to turn off cell phones—are interpolated.  Unlike other symphonies or venues, Redwood Symphony is noted for allowing the silent use of mobile devices with lighted screens from within a designated seating area during performances.

Redwood Symphony is also dedicated to educational outreach, introducing and fostering an appreciation of classical and contemporary music especially by youth.  In order to reach new and younger audiences, Redwood Symphony enthusiastically offers children under 18 free admission to most performances when accompanied by an adult.  It also features an annual "Meet the Orchestra" night at its "Family Concert," where the orchestra sections divide themselves into separate rooms to meet audience members prior to the main performance, and demonstrate their various instruments, sounds, and techniques, while answering questions presented.  At this same Family Concert, a limited number of lucky children have a brief opportunity to actually conduct the Redwood Symphony under the tutelage of Dr. Kujawsky.

Highlights of Redwood Symphony’s history include:
 Notable premieres (see below)
 A complete Mahler symphony cycle (and a nearly complete second cycle), including two different versions of the complete Tenth Symphony.
 John Corigliano’s Symphony No. 1 (“Of Rage and Remembrance”) (1993)
 Charles Ives’s Symphony No. 4  (1998)
 Michael Daugherty’s Metropolis Symphony (2002)
 H.K. Gruber’s Frankenstein!! (2004)
 Olivier Messiaen’s Turangalila Symphony  (2008)
 Mason Bates's Alternative Energy (2016)
 Performances of complete concert operas, including Porgy and Bess, Candide and Don Giovanni.

Conductor

The music director and conductor of Redwood Symphony is Dr. Eric Kujawsky, whose teachers included Samuel Krachmalnick, Paul Vermel and Andor Toth. He has performed with the Aspen Music Festival, several Bay Area orchestras and choruses, and with TheatreWorks in Palo Alto, Ramshead Productions at Stanford, and the Cañada College Drama Department. Dr. Kujawsky made his Davies Symphony Hall debut with Redwood Symphony and the San Francisco Gay Men's Chorus in June 1996.

Notable Premieres
 Concerto for Orchestra ("Jubilee Games") - Oct. 11, 1991 - west coast premiere of Leonard Bernstein's last orchestral work
 Every Good Boy Deserves Favour - Oct. 11, 1992 - Bay Area premiere of a play with actors and orchestra by Tom Stoppard and André Previn
 Serenada Schizophrana - Oct. 2, 2005 - west coast premiere of Danny Elfman's first symphonic work
 Il Sogno - Oct. 8, 2006 - west coast premiere of Elvis Costello’s first orchestral work

Recordings
 Stravinsky: Petrushka / The Soldier's Tale, 1992, Clarity Records
 In their first CD, Kujawsky uses his own hybrid of Petrushka, combining the original 1911 version with the composer’s 1947 revision.
 Stravinsky: The Rite of Spring / Les Noces, 1995, Clarity Records
 This is the only version of Les Noces available in English.
 Rodeo / Fanfare for the Common Man / An American in Paris, 1998, Redwood Recordings
 A rare recording of the complete Rodeo ballet score.
 The Sorcerer's Apprentice / Pictures at an Exhibition / The Creation of the World, 1998, Redwood Recordings
 Kujawsky’s Pictures includes some scoring revisions (including contrabass clarinet, extra brass in the finale), and transition from the descending eighth-note passage in Great Gate of Kiev rewritten by George Yefchak.
 Bartók: Concerto for Orchestra, 2000, Redwood Recordings
 Both of Bartók’s endings are included.  Includes First Rumanian Rhapsody by Enesco.
 Conga Line in Hell, 2002, Redwood Recordings
 Includes World Premiere recording of Miguel del Aguila’s Conga-Line in Hell.  Also Debussy's "Afternoon of a Faun," Copland's "El Salon Mexico" and Strauss' "Till Eulenspiegel".

References
http://www.sfcv.org/article/music-news-aug-7-2012#anchor1 
http://www.sfcv.org/reviews/redwood-symphony/rustling-among-the-redwoods 
http://www.sfcv.org/reviews/redwood-symphony/storm-and-sunshine-in-the-redwoods 
http://www.sfcv.org/reviews/redwood-symphony/rhythm-in-the-redwoods
http://www.bravocalifornia.com/?p=586
Ross, Alex. "On the Road - Three orchestras, three cities, two days", The New Yorker, New York, 25 June 2007.

External links
 Redwood Symphony – Official website
 RSO – Archive of program notes
 

Musical groups established in 1985
Musical groups from the San Francisco Bay Area
Organizations based in the San Francisco Bay Area
Orchestras based in California
1985 establishments in California